The S3 is a commuter rail route forming part of the Milan suburban railway service, which converges on the city of Milan, Italy.

The service runs over the Milan–Saronno railway, the oldest line owned by the Ferrovie Nord Milano. Like all other Milan suburban railway service routes, it is operated by Trenord.

Route 

Line S3, a radial route, runs from Saronno in a south easterly direction, via the Milan–Saronno railway, to Milano Cadorna, the railway's urban terminus. The travel takes 35 minutes.

History
The S3 was incorporated into the suburban service on 12 December 2004.

Stations 
The stations on the S3 are as follows (stations with blue background are in the municipality of Milan):

Scheduling 
, S3 trains ran every thirty minutes between 06:00 and 01:00 daily.

See also 

 History of rail transport in Italy
 List of Milan suburban railway stations
 Rail transport in Italy
 Transport in Milan

References

External links
 ATM  – official site 
 Trenord – official site 
 Schematic of Line S3 – schematic depicting all stations on Line S3

This article is based upon a translation of the Italian language version as at November 2012.

Milan S Lines